Andrei Konstantinovich Ivanov (born 7 February 1987) is a Russian badminton player.

Achievements

BWF International Challenge/Series 
Men's doubles

Mixed doubles

  BWF International Challenge tournament
  BWF International Series tournament
  BWF Future Series tournament

References

External links 
 

1987 births
Living people
Sportspeople from Omsk
Russian male badminton players